Virje is a municipality in the Koprivnica–Križevci County in Croatia. According to the 2001 census, there are 5,197 inhabitants in the area, with Croats forming an absolute majority. St. Martin of Tours is the patron saint of this municipality.

History
In the late 19th century and early 20th century, Virje was part of the Bjelovar-Križevci County of the Kingdom of Croatia-Slavonia.

External links
 Virje

Municipalities of Croatia
Populated places in Koprivnica-Križevci County